Malik Meraj Khalid (1 February 1916 – 13 June 2003), was a Pakistani advocate, left wing politician and Marxist philosopher who served as Caretaker prime minister of Pakistan from November 1996 until February 1997. He was noted as being one of the original philosophers and founding personalities of the Pakistan Peoples Party (PPP).

Born in 1916 to a poor farming family in Punjab, British India, he graduated in law from the Islamia College (Lahore) in 1942, starting his legal practices by establishing his own law firm in 1948. Inspired by the communist literature published in the Soviet Union, his initial public community work was aimed towards promoting the literacy in his native village. In 1967, he was one of the founders of the PPP and ascended towards holding the highly important public offices. Responsible for administrating and maintaining the control of the Punjab Province after the war with India in 1971, Meraj Khalid was appointed as law minister in 1974 and the Speaker of the National Assembly in two non-consecutive terms.

However, his tough and rigorous Hard Left ideas led to developing political differences with Prime Minister Benazir Bhutto in the 1990s, by whom he was sacked in 1996 after levelling accusations against Asif Zardari for the murder of Murtaza Bhutto. Being appointed as caretaker prime minister, Meraj Khalid then worked to rally the anti–Benazir Bhutto forces, and his efforts contributed to Nawaz Sharif and the conservatives' landslide victory in the 1997 parliamentary elections.

Early life and career beginnings
Malik Meraj Khalid was born in Dera Chahal, a small village near Burki District. Lahore, to a poor and farming family. During his early life, he saw his family struggle with hardship to survive in the feudalism spectrum where his family grew crops for a local feudal lord who paid less than the minimum wage set by the British Indian Empire government. However, Meraj Khalid did not abandon his school, and despite the hardship, Khalid completed his high-school and later went on to work for a feudal lord who agreed to finance his education.

He was educated at Islamia College, Lahore and gained an LLB degree in 1944, from Punjab University Law College, Lahore, followed by an Associate degree in public works. In 1948, he began to practice law. He was elected to the Provincial Assembly of West Pakistan for the first time in 1965. In 1968, he joined the Pakistan Peoples Party (PPP) and was appointed President of its Lahore chapter. It was on the PPP ticket that he was successfully re-elected to the National Assembly of Pakistan in 1970.

Statesmanship
Malik Meraj Khalid, famous for his gentleness and honesty, was a favourite of Zulfiqar Ali Bhutto, the flamboyant Prime Minister of Pakistan during the 1970s. It was he who played a major role in the political career of Meraj Khalid by first appointing him as his Minister for Food and Agriculture and Under-Developed Areas in December 1971. Afterwards he was appointed Chief of the Party's Parliamentary Affairs in November 1972, and Minister of Social Welfare, Local Government and Rural Development in 1975.

Member and Speaker of National Assembly
After the execution of Zulfiqar Ali Bhutto in April 1979, he was nominated member of the PPP's Central Committee, but he eventually resigned from this position in January 1988. After once more successfully returning to the National Assembly in 1988, he was once again appointed as Speaker of the National Assembly in 1988. However, he lost the subsequent elections in 1993, and remained aloof from politics for some time. During this period of solitude, he served as the Rector of International Islamic University in Islamabad in 1997.

Interim Prime Minister
President Farooq Leghari, using the powers granted him by the Eighth Amendment to the Constitution of Pakistan, dismissed the government of Benazir Bhutto in November 1996 again, for corruption and politically motivated killings. Malik Meraj Khalid was asked to officiate the interim government before new elections, but as prime minister Meraj Khalid continued to live his simple life and his Lahore home too remained as accessible as ever.

Death and legacy
Malik Meraj KhalidI peacefully died on 13 June 2003 at age 87 in his residence in Lahore, and was buried with full state honour in a local cemetery. He was survived by his widow and an adopted son.

His obituary in The Guardian noted that "Meraj was perhaps the one Pakistani politician intensely engaged with community work while in high office, and whenever out of office, or out of favor with his party, he returned to grassroots activism, gaining respect and affection across the spectrum. Amid political extremists and Bonapartist generals, he was a model of reason".

References

External links
 Chronicles Of Pakistan
 A profile of Malik Meraj Khalid
  Meraj Khalid passes away

|-

 
|-

 
|-

 

1916 births
2003 deaths
Punjabi people
Lawyers from Lahore
Government Islamia College alumni
Pakistani Marxists
Pakistani communists
Pakistani socialists
Marxist writers
Pakistan People's Party politicians
Chief Ministers of Punjab, Pakistan
Agriculture ministers of Pakistan
Food ministers of Pakistan
Law Ministers of Pakistan
Pakistani sports executives and administrators
Caretaker prime ministers of Pakistan
Speakers of the National Assembly of Pakistan
Government of Benazir Bhutto staffers and personnel
Pakistani MNAs 1988–1990
Pakistani MNAs 1977
Punjab MPAs 1972–1977
Central Model School, Lahore alumni
20th-century Pakistani  lawyers